Saphenista leuconigra is a species of moth of the family Tortricidae. It is found in Carchi Province, Ecuador.

The wingspan is about 26 mm. The ground colour of the forewings is cream white, the costa suffused with brownish and the dorsum and postmedian surface with grey. The hindwings are cream, in the apical part slightly mixed with ochreous.

Etymology
The species name refers to the colouration of the forewings and is derived from Greek/Latin leucos
(meaning white) and niger (meaning black).

References

Moths described in 2008
Saphenista